"The Beat of Your Heart" is a song by British alternative rock band Bush. It was the third single released from their seventh studio effort Black and White Rainbows.

Chart

References 

2017 singles
2017 songs
Bush (British band) songs
Songs written by Gavin Rossdale